Newell Run is an unincorporated community in Washington County, in the U.S. state of Ohio.

History
A post office called Newell Run was established in 1866, and remained in operation until 1914. Besides the post office, Newell Run had a country store.

References

Unincorporated communities in Washington County, Ohio
Unincorporated communities in Ohio